The AN/PRC-152 Multiband Handheld Radio, also known as Harris Falcon III, is a portable, compact, tactical software-defined combat-net radio manufactured by Harris Corporation. It is compliant without waivers to the Joint Tactical Radio System (JTRS) Software Communications Architecture (SCA). It has received NSA certification for the transmission of Top Secret data.

The designation AN/PRC signifies Army/Navy Portable Radio used for two way Communications and is based on the Joint Electronics Type Designation System guidelines.

Users

The AN/PRC-152 radio is currently in use with the US Navy Explosive Ordnance Disposal (EOD) teams in their MRAP JERRV vehicles. As of 2005, 1,300 radios have also been fielded in vehicles by the US Army. and more than 8,600 have been fielded by the U.S. Marines. An undetermined number are in use by the US Air Force in Iraq and Afghanistan. More recently the radio was photographed with Prince Harry, then a 23-year-old second lieutenant in the Household Cavalry of the British Army. He was responsible for providing cover for troops on the frontline as a Forward Air Controller (FAC) employing the AN/PRC-152 Multiband Handheld and other systems.

Specifications

General
Frequency Range: 30 to 511.99 MHz
Presets: 99
Transmission Modes: FM, AM, PSK, CPM
Tuning Resolution: 10 Hz

Transmitter
Output Power: 250 mW to 5 W / VSAT 10 W
Harmonic Suppression: –47 dBc
Frequency Stability: +/- 2.5 ppm

Receiver
FM Sensitivity -116 dBm (12 dB SINAD)
Adjacent Channel Greater than 55 dB Rejection

Interoperability
Crypto Modes KY-57/VINSON, ANDVT/KYV-5, KG-84C, FASCINATOR, AES
Fill devices: AN/CYZ-10 DTD, AN/PYQ-10 Simple Key Loader (SKL) (Supports DS-101, DS-102 and Mode 2/3)
Radios
AN/PRC-117F
AN/PRC-113
AN/PRC-119A/B
AN/PRC-148
AN/PRC-77 Portable Transceiver
PSC-5
 AN/PRC-117G
 RF-310
 Optional internal GPS

Interfaces
External Data: RS-232, RS-422, MIL-STD-188-114A
Remote control: USB, RS-232
Antenna: 50 Ohm TNC
Audio: Six-pin Standard

Physical Dimensions
64(68.6 GPS) x 234 x 43 mm 2.5(2.7 GPS) W x 9.2 H x 1.7 D inches (with battery)
Weight: 1.22 kg 2.7 lb  (with battery and GPS)

Environmental
Temperature: -31 °C to 60 °C
Immersion: 2 Meter
Test Method: MIL-STD-810F
Finish: CARC Green, CARC Khaki

Key Features
SCA v2.2
Sierra II Programmable Crypto
Built-in Speaker/Mic
Full Numeric Keypad
NVG Compatible Display
Embedded GPS (optional)
MELP

Waveforms
SINCGARS
VHF/UHF AM/FM (VULOS)
MIL-STD-188-181B Advanced Narrowband Digital Voice Terminal (ANDVT) and 56 kbit/s data
HAVE QUICK II
High performance waveform (HPW)
Satcom
OTAR
A software option supports Project 25 (APCO-25), used by federal, state, province and local public safety agencies in North America, including Triple DES encryption.

See also
AN/PRC-150
AN/PRC-117F
AN/PRC-119
AN/PRC-113
AN/PRC-148
Tactical Vest Antenna System

References

Military radio systems of the United States
Military electronics of the United States
Military equipment introduced in the 2000s